Palace of Laughter was a radio comedy aired by the BBC on Radio 4 from 2002 to 2003.

A series of programmes hosted by Geoffrey Wheeler that visited old music halls in the British Isles, it focused on those that are particularly grand in their style of building. 

The programmes have been played again on Fridays in 2006 on BBC 7. During their run, they can be heard at the BBC 7 Listen Again page.

List of shows 
 First Series (2002)
 London Windmill
 Glasgow Pavilion Theatre
 Manchester Playhouse
 Grand Blackpool
 Alhambra Leicester Square
 Belfast Grand Opera House
 Second Series (2003)
 22 July 2003 - Sunderland Empire
 29 July 2003 - Royal Hippodrome, Eastbourne
 5 August 2003 - Gaiety Theatre, Dublin
 12 August 2003 - The Alhambra, Bradford
 19 August 2003 - The Grand, Swansea
 26 August 2003 - Gaiety Theatre, Ayr

BBC Radio comedy programmes